Yamut (also Romanized as Yamūt) is a village in Jafarbay-ye Jonubi Rural District, in the Central District of Torkaman County, Golestan Province, Iran. At the 2006 census, its population was 88, in 21 families.

References 

Populated places in Torkaman County